Seyyed Hossein Ayatollahi (Persian:سید حسین آیت‌اللهی) (August 1931 – 14 January 2001) was a Shiite clergyman, Ruhollah Khomeini Representative and Imam of Friday prayer of Jahrom.

See also 

Ayatollah Seyed Abdol Hossein Mousavi Najafi Lari

References 

1931 births
2001 deaths
People from Jahrom
Muslim People's Republic Party politicians